Cumbria Wildlife Trust is a wildlife trust covering the county of Cumbria, England. It runs more than 40 nature reserves, and aims to broaden the awareness and knowledge of the wildlife in the county.

History
The trust was established in 1962 as the Lake District Naturalists' Trust. It changed its name to the Cumbria Trust for Nature Conservation in 1974, when the county of Cumbria was created.

Its headquarters are near Kendal, at the edge of the Lake District National Park. Most of the reserves, which include peat bogs (Witherslack Mosses), limestone pavements (Hutton Roof Crags), ancient woodlands and coastal sites (South Walney), are outside the national park. Recent acquisitions include Craggy Wood at Staveley.

Activities
The trust runs educational programmes for visitors, suitable for all ages, and welcomes the involvement of volunteers. It also campaigns regionally and nationally on a range of wildlife issues.

In recent years it has been involved with hay meadows (via the Coronation Meadows project and the trust's own Meadow Life project) and the designation of Marine Conservation Zones in the Irish Sea.

References

External links
Cumbria Wildlife Trust website

Organisations based in Cumbria
Wildlife Trusts of England
1962 establishments in England